GY, Gy, or gy may refer to:

Units of measurement
 Gray (unit) (Gy), SI unit of absorbed radiation
 Giga-year, 1,000,000,000 years (non-SI)
 Galactic year, the time it takes for the solar system to orbit the galactic center

People
 Pierre Gy (1924–2015), French chemist and statistician
 Garin de Gy, 14th century Catholic Master of the Order of Preachers

Places
 Gy, Switzerland, a village in the Geneva canton
 Guyana (ISO country code: GY)
 .gy, the country code top level domain (ccTLD) for Guyana
 GY postcode area for Guernsey, Alderney and Sark
 Gy, Haute-Saône, a commune in the Haute-Saône département of France
 Great Yarmouth, United Kingdom
 Grimsby, United Kingdom

Transport
 GY, a Mazda automotive piston engine
 Gabon Airlines (IATA code: GY)
 Tri-MG Intra Asia Airlines's IATA code

Other uses 
 Hungarian gy, an alphabetic digraph
 gy, a digraph in the Tibetan pinyin transliteration system
 GenCorp (GY NYSE symbol)
 Green Youth (disambiguation), one of two Green party youth wings
 Grapevine yellows, a plant disease
 Gy, the on-line charging interface in the GPRS core network